The 2019 Monza FIA Formula 3 round was a motor racing event held on 7 and 8 September 2019 at the Autodromo Nazionale di Monza, Monza, Italy. It was the penultimate round of the 2019 FIA Formula 3 Championship, and ran in support of the 2019 Italian Grand Prix.

Classification

Qualifying 
The Qualifying session took place on 6 September 2019, with Christian Lundgaard scoring pole position.

Race 1

Race 2

See also 

 2019 Italian Grand Prix
 2019 Monza Formula 2 round

References

External links 
Official website

|- style="text-align:center"
|width="35%"|Previous race:
|width="30%"|FIA Formula 3 Championship2019 season
|width="40%"|Next race:

2019 FIA Formula 3 Championship
2019 in Italian sport
2019 in Italian motorsport